Ochiltree is a surname. Notable people with the surname include:

Michael Ochiltree, 15th-century Scottish prelate
Thomas P. Ochiltree (1837–1902), American politician
William Beck Ochiltree (1811–1867), American judge

See also
Tom Ochiltree (1872–1897), American Thoroughbred racehorse